Steven Coleman (born August 8, 1950) is a former American football defensive end who played one season with the Denver Broncos of the National Football League. He played college football at Delaware State University and attended Germantown High School in Philadelphia, Pennsylvania.

References

External links
Just Sports Stats
Pro Football Reference

Living people
1950 births
Players of American football from Philadelphia
American football defensive ends
Delaware State Hornets football players
Denver Broncos players